The term conjunto (literally 'group', 'ensemble') refers to several types of small musical ensembles present in different Latin American musical traditions, mainly in Mexico and Cuba. While Mexican conjuntos play styles such as norteño and tejano, Cuban conjuntos specialize in the son, as well as its derivations such as salsa.

Mexican 
Mexican conjunto music, also known as conjunto tejano, was born in south Texas at the end of the 19th century, after German settlers introduced the button accordion. The bajo sexto has come to accompany the button accordion and is integral to the conjunto sound. Many conjuntos are concentrated in the Southwestern portion of the United States, primarily in Texas and California. In Mexico, the term conjunto is associated with norteño and tejano music. Since tejano was bred out of norteño music originally, this association is not entirely false. However, due to various cultural and socioeconomic developments in the 1900s, norteño musicians began trailblazing the tejano genre as a tangent to conjunto.

In the United States and Mexico, a conjunto band is composed of four main instruments: the button accordion, the bajo sexto, an electric bass, and a drum set. They are popular in northern Mexico and southern Texas. German and East European settlers brought their accordions, waltzes and polkas to the region, which were adapted by the local population. Texas accordion player Flaco Jiménez is probably the best-known conjunto musician in the United States, with a career spanning sixty years and earning him six Grammy awards. Chulas Fronteras is a documentary film from the 1970s which illustrates how the music meshed into the lives of families in south Texas and northern Mexico.

Other types of Mexican conjunto

Jarocho
A conjunto jarocho is a type of Mexican folk ensemble. Often it consists of requinto, arpa jarocha, jarana and leona, but can also have violin, pandero octagonal, quijada, marimbol or güiro.

Huasteco
A conjunto huasteco is a type of Mexican folk ensemble. Often it consists of guitarra huapanguera, jarana huasteca and violin, but can also have other violins and guitars.

Arpa grande
A conjunto de arpa grande is a type of Mexican folk ensemble. Often it consists of diatonic harp, Mexican vihuela, guitar and two violins.

Calentano
A conjunto calentano is a type of Mexican folk ensemble. Often it consists of violin, guitar and tamborita, but can also have other violin, guitarra panzona, guitarra sexta and harp. Its repertory covers calentano music: sones calentanos and gustos, and other musical forms such as Indias, malagueñas, peteneras, valses, polkas, pasos dobles, sones, chilenas, minuets, rancheras, and corridos.

Cuban 

Cuban conjunto music was developed in the 1940s by famous tres player Arsenio Rodríguez by adding several instruments (a piano, a tumbadora and various trumpets) to the typical son cubano ensemble, the septeto. Septetos consisted of a lead vocalist and guitar(s), double bass, bongó, maracas and trumpet. Even though the origins of the conjunto cubano can be traced to several sextetos and septetos of the 1920s, it wasn't until the 1940s when Arsenio Rodríguez expanded the Sexteto Bellamar that the conjunto was established. However, some authors argue that the Conjunto Kubavana, conducted by Alberto Ruiz, was the very first Cuban conjunto, founded around 1937. The conjunto contrasted with ballroom orchestras, the charangas, orquestas and danzoneras that were made popular by bandleaders such as Antonio Arcaño.

Conjunto music was crucial in the early development of salsa. In the late 1950s and early 1960s, the Puerto Rican music scene in New York City revolved around charangas such as Charlie Palmieri's Duboney Orchestra. Their music was largely based on Cuban styles such as mambo, chachachá and, most importantly, pachanga. Key charanga flautist, bandleader and entrepreneur Johnny Pacheco switched from the charanga configuration to the conjunto in 1964. However, the first New York-based conjunto was Eddie Palmieri's "La Perfecta", which had its debut in 1962. These conjuntos would be crucial in the early development of the most successful Latin American music genre to date, salsa. Notably, the introduction of Puerto Rican music styles such as bomba and plena within the conjunto and Cuban music in general resulted in what is known today as salsa.

See also 
Mexican music
Cuban music

References

Further reading

External links 
 PBS.org: documentary video - "Accordion Dreams" — history of Conjunto music.
 PBS−WBGU.org: documentary video - "Playing From the Heart" — about a Conjunto musician.
 Buscon.rae.es: "Conjunto definition"—

Regional styles of Mexican music
Latin music genres
Music of Texas
Cuban styles of music
German-American culture in Texas
Son cubano
Tejano music